Alan Sillitoe FRSL (4 March 192825 April 2010) was an English writer and one of the so-called "angry young men" of the 1950s. He disliked the label, as did most of the other writers to whom it was applied. He is best known for his debut novel Saturday Night and Sunday Morning and his early short story "The Loneliness of the Long Distance Runner", both of which were adapted into films.

Biography 
Sillitoe was born in Nottingham to working-class parents, Christopher Sillitoe and Sabina (née Burton). Like Arthur Seaton, the anti-hero of his first novel, Saturday Night and Sunday Morning, his father worked at the Raleigh Bicycle Company's factory in the town. His father was illiterate, violent, and unsteady with his jobs, and the family was often on the brink of starvation.

Sillitoe left school at the age of 14, having failed the entrance examination to grammar school. He worked at the Raleigh factory for the next four years, spending his free time reading prodigiously and being a "serial lover of local girls". He joined the Air Training Corps in 1942, then the Royal Air Force, albeit too late to serve in the Second World War. He served as a wireless operator in Malaya during the Emergency. After returning to Britain he was planning to enlist in the Royal Canadian Air Force when it was discovered that he had tuberculosis. He spent 16 months in an RAF hospital.

Pensioned off at the age of 21 on 45 shillings (£2.25) a week, he lived in France and Spain for seven years in an attempt to recover. In 1955, while living in Mallorca with the American poet Ruth Fainlight, whom he married in 1959, and in contact with the poet Robert Graves, Sillitoe started work on Saturday Night and Sunday Morning, which was published in 1958. Influenced in part by the stripped-down prose of Ernest Hemingway, the book conveys the attitudes and situation of a young factory worker faced with the inevitable end of his youthful philandering. As with John Osborne's Look Back in Anger and John Braine's Room at the Top, the novel's real subject was the disillusionment of post-war Britain and the lack of opportunities for the working class. It was adapted as a film by Karel Reisz in 1960, with Albert Finney as Arthur Seaton; the screenplay was written by Sillitoe.

Sillitoe's story The Loneliness of the Long Distance Runner, which concerns the rebellion of a borstal boy with a talent for running, won the Hawthornden Prize in 1959. It was also adapted into a film, in 1962, directed by Tony Richardson and starring Tom Courtenay. Sillitoe again wrote the screenplay.

With Fainlight he had a child, David. They later adopted another, Susan. Sillitoe lived at various times in Kent, London and Montpellier. In London he was friendly with the bookseller Bernard Stone (who had been born in Nottingham a few years before Sillitoe) and became one of the bohemian crowd that congregated at Stone's Turret Bookshop on Kensington Church Walk.

In the 1960s Sillitoe was celebrated in the Soviet Union as a spokesman for the "oppressed worker" in the West. Invited to tour the country, he visited several times in the 1960s and in 1968 he was asked to address the Congress of Soviet Writers' Unions, where he denounced Soviet human rights abuses, many of which he had witnessed.

In 1990 Sillitoe was awarded an honorary degree by Nottingham Polytechnic, now Nottingham Trent University. The city's older Russell Group university, the University of Nottingham, also awarded him an honorary D.Litt. in 1994. In 2006 his best-known play was staged at the university's Lakeside Arts theatre in an in-house production.

Sillitoe wrote many novels and several volumes of poems. His autobiography, Life Without Armour, which was critically acclaimed on publication in 1995, offers a view of his squalid childhood. In an interview Sillitoe claimed that "A writer, if he manages to earn a living at what he's doing, even if it's a very poor living, acquires some of the attributes of the old-fashioned gentleman (if I can be so silly)."

Gadfly in Russia, an account of his travels in Russia spanning 40 years, was published in 2007. In 2008 London Books republished A Start in Life in its London Classics series to mark the author's 80th birthday. Sillitoe appeared on Desert Island Discs on BBC Radio 4 on 25 January 2009.

Sillitoe's long-held desire for Saturday Night and Sunday Morning to be remade for a contemporary filmgoing audience was never achieved, despite strong efforts. Danny Brocklehurst was to adapt the book and Sillitoe gave his blessing to the project, but Tony Richardson's estate and Woodfall Films prevented it from going ahead.

Sillitoe was elected a Fellow of the Royal Society of Literature in 1997.

Death

Sillitoe died of cancer on 25 April 2010 at Charing Cross Hospital in London. He was 82. He is buried in Highgate Cemetery.

Works

Novels
 Saturday Night and Sunday Morning, London:  Allen, 1958; New York:  Knopf, 1959. New edition (1968) has an introduction by Sillitoe, commentary and notes by David Craig. Longman edition (1976) has a sequence of Nottingham photographs, and stills from the film, Harlow.
 The General, London: Allen, 1960; New York: Knopf, 1961
 Key to the Door, London: Allen, 1961; New York: Knopf, 1962; reprinted, with a new preface by Sillitoe, London: Allen, 1978
 The Death of William Posters, London: Allen, 1965; New York: Knopf, 1965
 A Tree on Fire, London: Macmillan, 1967; Garden City, NY:  Doubleday, 1968
 A Start in Life, London: Allen, 1970; New York: Scribners, 1971
 Travels in Nihilon, London: Allen, 1971; New York: Scribners, 1972
 The Flame of Life, London: Allen, 1974
 The Widower's Son, Allen, 1976; New York: Harper & Row, 1977
 The Storyteller, London: Allen, 1979; New York: Simon & Schuster, 1980.
 Her Victory, London: Granada, 1982; New York: Watts, 1982
 The Lost Flying Boat, London: Granada, 1983; Boston: Little, Brown, 1983
 Down from the Hill, London: Granada, 1984
 Life Goes On, London: Granada, 1985
 Out of the Whirlpool. London: Hutchinson, 1987
 The Open Door, London: Grafton/Collins, 1989
 Last Loves, London: Grafton, 1990; Boston: Chivers, 1991
 Leonard's War: A Love Story. London: HarperCollins, 1991
 Snowstop, London: HarperCollins, 1993
 The Broken Chariot, London: Flamingo/HarperCollins, 1998
 The German Numbers Woman, London: Flamingo/HarperCollins, 1999
 Birthday, London: Flamingo/HarperCollins, 2001
 A Man of His Time, Flamingo (UK), 2004, ; Harper Perennial (US), 2005. ;

Collections of short stories
 The Loneliness of the Long Distance Runner, London: Allen, 1959; New York: Knopf, 1960
 The Ragman’s Daughter and Other Stories, London: Allen, 1963; New York: Knopf, 1964
 Guzman, Go Home, and Other Stories, London: Macmillan, 1968; Garden City, NY: Doubleday, 1969; reprinted, with a new preface by Sillitoe, London; Allen, 1979
 Men, Women and Children, London: Allen, 1973; New York: Scribners, 1974
 Down to the Bone, Exeter: Wheaton, 1976
 The Second Chance and Other Stories, London: Cape, 1981; New York:  Simon & Schuster, 1981
 The Far Side of the Street: Fifteen Short Stories, London: Allen, 1988
 Alligator Playground: A Collection of Short Stories, Flamingo, 1997, 
 New and Collected Stories, Carroll and Graf, 2005.

Compilations
 Every Day of the Week: An Alan Sillitoe Reader, with an introduction by John Sawkins London: Allen, 1987
 Collected Stories, London: Flamingo, 1995; New York: HarperCollins, 1996

Writing for children
 The City Adventures of Marmalade Jim, London: Macmillan, 1967; Toronto: Macmillan, 1967; revised ed., London: Robson, 1977
 Big John and the Stars, London: Robson, 1977
 The Incredible Fencing Fleas, London: Robson, 1978. Illus. Mike Wilks.
 Marmalade Jim at the Farm, London: Robson, 1980
 Marmalade Jim and the Fox, London: Robson, 1984

Essays/travel
 Road to Volgograd, London: Allen, 1964; New York: Knopf, 1964
 Raw Material, London: Allen, 1972; New York:  Scribners, 1973; rev. ed., London: Pan Books, 1974; further revised, London: Star Books, 1978; further revised, London: Allen, 1979
 Mountains and Caverns: Selected Essays, London: Allen, 1975
 Words Broadsheet Nineteen, by Sillitoe and Ruth Fainlight. Bramley, Surrey: Words Press, 1975. Broadside
 "The Interview", London: The 35s (Women's Campaign for Soviet Jewry), 1976
 Israel: Poems on a Hebrew Theme, with drawings by Ralph Steadman; London: Steam Press, 1981 98 copies.
 The Saxon Shore Way: From Gravesend to Rye, by Sillitoe and Fay Godwin. London: Hutchinson, 1983
 Alan Sillitoe’s Nottinghamshire, with photographs by David Sillitoe. London: Grafton, 1987
 Shylock the Writer, London: Turret Bookshop, 1991
 The Mentality of the Picaresque Hero, London: Turret Bookshop, 1993, Turret Papers, no. 2. (500 copies)
 Leading the Blind: A Century of Guidebook Travel. 1815-1914, London: Macmillan, 1995
 Gadfly in Russia, JR Books, 2007

Plays
 Three Plays, London:  Allen, 1978 Contains The Slot-Machine, The Interview, Pit Strike

Autobiography
Life Without Armour, (HarperCollins, 1995) ,

Collections of poems
 Without Beer or Bread, Dulwich Village: Outposts, 1957
 The Rats and Other Poems, London: Allen, 1960
 Falling Out of Love and Other Poems, London; Allen, 1964; Garden City, NY: Doubleday, 1964
 Shaman and Other Poems", Turret, 1968 (Limited ed. of 500 copies, 100 copies signed and numbered)
 Love in the Environs of Voronezh and Other Poems, London: Macmillan, 1968; Garden City, NY: Doubleday, 1969.
 Poems, by Sillitoe, Ruth Fainlight and Ted Hughes; London: Rainbow Press, 1971. (300 copies)
 From Canto Two of The Rats, Wittersham, Kent: Alan Sillitoe, 1973
 Barbarians and Other Poems, London: Turret Books, 1973. 500 copies
 Storm: New Poems, London: Allen, 1974
 Somme, London: Steam Press, 1974. In Steam Press Portfolio, no. 2. 50 copies
 Day-Dream Communiqué, Knotting, Bedfordshire: Sceptre Press, 1977. 150 copies
 From Snow on the North Side of Lucifer, Knotting, Bedfordshire:  Sceptre Press, 1979. (150 copies)
 Snow on the North Side of Lucifer: Poems, London: Allen, 1979
 Poems for Shakespeare 7, Bear Gardens Museum and Arts Centre, 1979 (Limited to 500 numbered copies)
 More Lucifer, Knotting, Bedfordshire: Martin Booth, 1980. 125 copies
 Sun Before Departure: Poems, 1974–1982, London: Granada, 1984
 Tides and Stone Walls: Poems, with photographs by Victor Bowley; London: Grafton, 1986
 Three Poems, Child Okefurd, Dorset: Words Press, 1988. 200 copies
 Collected Poems, London:  HarperCollins, 1993

Film scripts
 Saturday Night and Sunday Morning (1960) (screenplay based on own novel)
 The Loneliness of the Long Distance Runner (1962) (screenplay based on own short story)
 Counterpoint (1967) (based on his novel The General)
 The Ragman's Daughter (1972) (based on short story)

Translations
Chopin's Winter in Majorca 1838–1839, by Luis Ripoll, translated by Sillitoe. Palma de Majorca: Mossen Alcover, 1955
Chopin’s Pianos: The Pleyel in Majorca, by Luis Ripoll, translated by Sillitoe. Palma de Majorca: Mossen Alcover, 1958
 All Citizens Are Soldiers (Fuente Ovejuna): A Play in Two Acts, by Lope de Vega, translated by Sillitoe and Ruth Fainlight. London: Macmillan, 1969; Chester Springs, PA: Dufour, 1969
 Poems for Shakespeare, volume 7, edited and translated by Sillitoe and Ruth Fainlight. London: Bear Gardens Museum & Arts Centre, 1980

References

Sources
Reuters

Further reading
 Gerard, David E., and H. W. Wilson. Alan Sillitoe: A Bibliography, Mansell, 1986 (UK) ; Meckler, 1988 (US) .
 Penner, Allen R. Alan Sillitoe, Twayne, 1972.
 Vaverka, Ronald Dee. Commitment as Art: A Marxist Critique of a Selection of Alan Sillitoe's Political Fiction. (1978 Dissertation, Uppsala University.)
 Atherton, Stanley S. Alan Sillitoe: A Critical Assessment, W. H. Allen, 1979. 
 Craig, David. The Roots of Sillitoe's Fiction. In The British Working-Class Novel in the Twentieth Century, ed. Jeremy Hawthorn, Edward Arnold, 1984. 
 Hitchcock, Peter. Working-Class Fiction in Theory and Practice: A Reading of Alan Sillitoe, UMI Research Press, 1989. 
 Wilding, Michael. 'Alan Sillitoe's Political Novels', Sydney Studies in Society and Culture, 8, 1993
 Hanson, Gillian Mary. Understanding Alan Sillitoe, Univ. of South Carolina Press, 1999. 
 Sawkins, John. The Long Apprenticeship: Alienation in the Early Work of Alan Sillitoe, Peter Lang, 2001. 
 Bradford, Richard. The Life of a Long-distance Writer: The Biography of Alan Sillitoe, Peter Owen, 2008.

External links

 
Ramsay Wood's 1971 interview 'Alan Sillitoe: The Image Shedding the Author', Four Quarters, La Salle University, Philadelphia, on Robert Twigger's blog 6 August 2011 
LeftLion interview with Alan Sillitoe
LeftLion obituary for Alan Sillitoe
The start of Alan Sillitoe : How Sillitoe stood apart from the tradition of other Northern novelists going soft and successful in the South; Times online 1 October 2008
Contemporary Writers: Alan Sillitoe
 Guardian article, 2004
 Guardian article, 2011
 Alan Sillitoe describes his life as a smoker prior to the England smoking ban
 The White Horse Public House made famous in 'Saturday Night & Sunday Morning'
  London Books
 Sillitoe Trail iPhone App James Walker and Paul Fillingham, Commissioned by Arts Council England and BBC. 28 October 2012.

1928 births
2010 deaths
20th-century British short story writers
20th-century English novelists
20th-century English poets
British male poets
Burials at Highgate Cemetery
Deaths from cancer in England
English male novelists
English male short story writers
English short story writers
English socialists
Fellows of the Royal Society of Literature
Military personnel from Nottingham
Royal Air Force personnel of the Malayan Emergency
Writers from Nottingham